Dallas Gaume (born August 27, 1963) is a Canadian former professional ice hockey centre. He played in four NHL games for the Hartford Whalers during the 1988–89 season. Gaume later spent nine seasons playing in Norway with the Trondheim IK before retiring in 1999. He subsequently took up a coaching role with the major junior Red Deer Rebels before working as a scout for the team.

Gaume was born in Innisfail, Alberta. He spent four seasons in the University of Denver, leading the team with 99 points in his final year as a first team all-American. He remains Denver's all-time leading scorer with 266 career points. He signed with the Hartford Whalers as a free agent and assigned to the AHL's Binghamton Whalers where he spent four seasons. He played four regular season games for Hartford in the 1988-89 NHL season, scoring a goal and an assist.

In 1990, Gaume moved to the Norwegian Eliteserien with Trondheim IK and remained there until his retirement in 1999.

Career statistics

Regular season and playoffs

Awards and honours

References

External links

1963 births
Living people
Binghamton Whalers players
Canadian expatriate ice hockey players in Norway
Canadian ice hockey centres
Denver Pioneers men's ice hockey players
Hartford Whalers players
Ice hockey people from Alberta
Swift Current Broncos players
Trondheim Black Panthers players
Undrafted National Hockey League players
AHCA Division I men's ice hockey All-Americans
People from Innisfail, Alberta